Transcription factor E2F2 is a protein that in humans is encoded by the E2F2 gene.

Function 

The protein encoded by this gene is a member of the E2F family of transcription factors. The E2F family plays a crucial role in the control of cell cycle and action of tumor suppressor proteins and is also a target of the transforming proteins of small DNA tumor viruses. The E2F proteins contain several evolutionally conserved domains found in most members of the family. These domains include a DNA binding domain, a dimerization domain which determines interaction with the differentiation regulated transcription factor proteins (DP), a transactivation domain enriched in acidic amino acids, and a tumor suppressor protein association domain which is embedded within the transactivation domain. This protein and another 2 members, E2F1 and E2F3, have an additional cyclin binding domain. This protein binds specifically to retinoblastoma protein pRB in a cell-cycle dependent manner, and it exhibits overall 46% amino acid identity to E2F1.

Interactions 

E2F2 has been shown to interact with:
 BRD2, 
 RYBP, and
 RB1.

See also 
 E2F

References

Further reading

External links 
 

Transcription factors